Victor Gilsoul (1867–1939) was a Belgian impressionist, luminist and painter who worked mostly on commissions from the European nobility.

Early life 

Victor Gilsoul was born in Brussels on October 9, 1867. Gilsoul's parents were Leopold Gilsoul and Thérèse Biers, who operated a pub in the suburbs of Brussels (Schaerbeek). The pub's clientele consisted mainly of unemployed painters and artists. The later known painter Louis Artan (1837-1890) was a regular customer and rented a room in the attic. Victor's father discouraged him from becoming an artist, but Louis Artan and animal painter Alfred Verwee (1838-1895) inspired the young Victor to become a painter. Gilsoul started drawing at age 12 and his work was received with enthusiasm by the regulars at the pub. He won first prize at the Academy of Fine Arts in Antwerp at 14 years old. In 1883, at 17, he had his first salon exhibition in Brussels.

Career 

Several royals of his time showed great interest in Gilsoul's work. In 1897, at an international exhibition in Munich, the Prince of Bavaria bought two of his paintings. King Leopold II of Belgium bought his painting twice, Crepuscule in 1890, and in 1901, thirteen paintings to decorate the royal yacht. Queen Mum Mary (mother of King Albert I of Belgium), in 1904, bought two of his paintings. In 1915, the city of Paris bought the painting Mannekensvere. In 1899, the Museum of Krefeld bought the painting Lever du lune. In 1902, the city of Brussels ordered four paintings. In 1903, Camille Mauclair (1872-1945), French poet and writer, wrote a monograph on Victor Gilsoul. Mauclair had the following to say about the painting Le Soir de Bruges: " Ce tableau est le Meilleur témoignage de l'art belge." (Trans. This painting is the best example of Belgian art.)

In 1914, at the beginning of World War I, Victor fled to the neutral Netherlands. Between, 1910 and 1923, during the French period, Victor Gilsoul had a studio in Paris (Avenue Villiers XVII arrondissement). In 1924, Victor became a professor at the Higher Institute for Fine Arts in Antwerp. In 1933, Gilsoul started to work on his last workshop, in Brussels (Woluwe-Saint-Lambert.  Victor Gilsoul died on December 5, 1939, the eve of World War II.

Personal life 
In 1894, Victor Gilsoul married fellow artist Ketty Hoppe. After he was convicted of arson in 1910, Gilsoul separated from his wife. In the same year, he was admitted to a psychiatric hospital and was put in a straitjacket. However, his personal physician got him released on the same day by negotiating and threatening a lawsuit. Later, Gilsoul moved to France and commuted between Paris and Belgium.

Legacy 
In 1898, King Leopold II of Belgium knighted Victor Gilsoul. In 1900, Gilsoul was awarded a silver medal at the World Exhibition in Paris for his paintings.

Gilsoul's art is found in significant public and private collections worldwide, including the Musee Charlier and the Antwerp Museum of Fine Arts, as well as museums located in Luxembourg, Namur, Ostende, Mons, Dordrecht, Brighton and Barcelona.

Style 

Four elements reoccur in his paintings: storms, waves, rivers and nature. In general, Gilsoul favored depictions of water. He style of painting went through various stages. His major works are neither entirely realistic, nor completely impressionistic. They were not created on site; however, they were the result of studies that he made consistently throughout his life. These studies of nature give a superposition of mood, deepening, images and light. Of these different images and sensations, he composed a summary on a large canvas, which has a stronger suggestive power than any painting of that nature.

Sources

Books 

 }}
 Meere de, J. M. M., Victor Gilsoul en de haven van Rotterdam, Velp, Nederland, 1998

Magazines 

 Solvay L., Victor Gilsoul, artiste peintre, in : Académie Royale de Belgique. Bulletin de la Classe des Beaux-Arts. Tome XXVI, 1944. Bruxelles, 1945, p. 43-52. 
 Veen, van der L., The Art of Victor Gilsoul, in: Studio, vol. 33 nr. 140, 1904, p. 118-124.

Archives 

 Algemeen Rijksarchief, Brussel
 Bibliotheek Vrije Universiteit, Brussel

1867 births
1939 deaths